Calosoma moniliatus is a species of ground beetle in the subfamily Carabinae. It was described by John Lawrence LeConte in 1851.

References

moniliatus
Beetles described in 1851